Ebrahim S. H. Dahodwala is a Chartered Accountant. He is the Chairman of BDO International Pakistan (BDO Ebrahim co). Ebrahim Dahodwala qualified as professional Accountant in 1951 and established the firm in the same year.

History 
He was the first President of Institute of Chartered Accountants of Pakistan (ICAP) from the profession, a position always held previously by the Secretaries to the Federal Government of Pakistan. He was also the first President of South Asian Federation of Accountants from Pakistan. This is a regional body representing the regulators of the profession in Pakistan, India, Sri Lanka, Bangladesh and Bhutan. He also has been President of the Income Tax Bar Association, Karachi. He has had the opportunity of having served as a member of International Accounting Standards Committee. He has been associated with the affairs of the Institute of Chartered Accountants of Pakistan since its inception in 1961, and has been the Institute's Vice President and chairman of several committees for a number of years. He has also been executive editor of the Pakistan Accountant (Institute's official journal). He has represented Pakistan a number of times in international forums like the CAPA Conferences and read papers on important technical subjects in several seminars and conferences.

References 
BDO Pakistan
ICAP

Living people
Pakistani accountants
Year of birth missing (living people)